The Forgotten Realms Atlas was a book produced by Karen Wynn Fonstad and provided detailed maps of the Forgotten Realms, a fictional setting in the Dungeons & Dragons fantasy role-playing game.

The atlas also included timelines of various novels set in the world. The book was 210 pages, and was published in August 1990.

Contents
The Forgotten Realms Atlas is an indexed book which contains three-color maps of the Forgotten Realms. This includes large, small scale regional maps (one inch to two hundred miles), as well as detailed location maps and diagrams of areas including the Moonshae Isles, the Northwest lands near Waterdeep, and the Western Heartlands areas around Cormyr and the Dalelands. These large scale maps cover the areas detailed in Forgotten Realms game modules and novels that had been published before the Atlas.

Publication history
The Forgotten Realms Atlas was designed by Karen Wynn Fonstad and published in 1990 as a 192-page book.

Reception
Lawrence Schick, in his 1991 book Heroic Worlds, calls the book a "very pretty, exhaustive sourcebook".

References

Fictional atlases
Forgotten Realms sourcebooks
Role-playing game supplements introduced in 1990